Parallel Dimensions is Perseo Miranda's fourth album, released on December 5, 2008, on Erga Editions. The album was recorded at Music Art studios (Italy) in August 2008. It's a single and It contains two tracks.

It had some good reviews: Italian webzine OndaAlternativa noted some changes in the style, moving from gothic metal to a kind of "trash-prog metal",.Powermetal.it described this work as hard rock music with modern ideas, especially in the guitar work.

Track listing

 Parallel Dimensions
 The Mountain

References

External links
 Perseo Miranda official website
 Perseo Miranda official Myspace site

2008 albums
Perseo Miranda albums